Coleophora kyffhusana is a moth of the family Coleophoridae. It is found from Sweden to Hungary and from Germany to southern Russia.

The wingspan is 9–10 mm. Adults are on wing from May to August.

The larvae feed on Gypsophila fastigiata. They create a brownish yellow tubular silken case of 5–6 mm with a mouth angle of about 45°. Cases are found on the upperside of the leaves.

References

Kyffhusana
Moths described in 1898
Moths of Europe